Daniel Ștefan Lupașcu (born 17 August 1981) is a Romanian former football player who played as a striker for teams such as CSM Reșița, Apulum Alba Iulia, Bihor Oradea or Arieșul Turda, among others. He played briefly in the Romanian Liga I with Dacia Mioveni.

References

External links
 
 
 Daniel Lupașcu at frf-ajf.ro

1981 births
Living people
People from Blaj
Romanian footballers
Association football forwards
Liga I players
Liga II players
CSM Reșița players
CSM Unirea Alba Iulia players
FC Bihor Oradea players
CS Mioveni players
ACS Sticla Arieșul Turda players
CS ACU Arad players
CS Luceafărul Oradea players